Vonda is located on Highway 27, a half-hour drive north east of Saskatoon, Saskatchewan. The town was named after the daughter of American journalist Cy Warman.

Vonda is home to the École Providence French language school providing Kindergarten to Grade 12, while Aberdeen Composite School in neighbouring Aberdeen provides Kindergarten to Grade 12 instruction in English.  The town also contains the Paroisse St. Philippe de Neri Parish Roman Catholic Church and the Sacred Heart Ukrainian Catholic Church.  The town is also home to the Vonda Memorial Rink. The town contains a Co-op, hotel and service businesses.

The Vonda post office originally opened on April 1, 1905 under the name Vaunder, changing its name to Vonda on May 1, 1906.

Demographics 

See also

 List of communities in Saskatchewan
 List of towns in Saskatchewan

References

External links

Grant No. 372, Saskatchewan
Towns in Saskatchewan
Division No. 15, Saskatchewan